Zodiac Mindwarp and the Love Reaction are a British hard rock group, which was formed in 1985.

Zodiac Mindwarp and the Love Reaction play a sleazy style of commercial hard rock featuring big riffs and choruses, as was the trend in the band's heyday of the mid-to-late 1980s and early 1990s. The camp lyrics are intended as self-parody, and can be seen as either humorous, or offensive by those who take them at face value, for their often lascivious and misogynist tone. Song titles like "Back Seat Education", "Feed My Frankenstein", "High Heeled Heaven", and "Trash Madonna" illustrate Mindwarp's tongue-in-cheek approach. Lyrical content also exhibits a send up of cult worship, often of Zodiac Mindwarp's self-proclaimed raging libido, with Mindwarp claiming the titles 'Sex Fuhrer', 'Love Dictator', and 'High Priest of Love'.

Overview
The band is the brainchild of Mark Manning, a former graphic artist and art editor of the now defunct Flexipop! magazine. The magazine folded back in 1982, but the hedonistic lifestyle of the rock and pop stars who frequented the magazine's offices fueled his desire to experience the debauchery of life as a decadent rock star. He joined another music publication called Metal Fury as a graphic designer, but assumed the alter ego 'Zodiac Mindwarp' at night. Zodiac Mindwarp was the namesake of a series of underground comics written and illustrated by Spain Rodriguez. Zodiac soon left Metal Fury and formed the Love Reaction in 1985 with Jimmy Cauty (who later formed The Orb, The Justified Ancients of Mu Mu and The KLF) on guitar; Kid Chaos (Stephen Harris) on bass; and Boom Boom Kaboomski on drums.

The band was signed to the Food label of Phonogram Records who soon issued their first recording, "Wild Child" with just Zodiac (playing guitar and vocals), Kid Chaos on bass and Jake Le Mesurier on drums. A demo version of "High Priest of Love" was included on the Melody Maker Vinyl Conflict 2 free EP in September 1986. By the end of the year the lineup had changed again to accommodate the still present figure of Cobalt Stargazer (Geoff Bird) and new drummer Slam Thunderhide (Stephen Landrum). That lineup contributed the studio track, "Drug Shoes," to the FOOD Imminent 2 various artists compilation.

At various times, the band has also featured Evil Bastard (Robert Munro who co-penned and sang on two B-sides: "Hangover from Hell" and "Lager Woman from Hell"), Heavy Metal Bear (Alex Bradly), Trash D Garbage (Paul Bailey), Flash Bastard (Jan Cyrka), Suzi X (Richard Levy), Tex Diablo (Christopher Renshaw), and Robbie Vom (Rob Morris).

Zodiac Mindwarp progressed rapidly from their first gig at Dingwalls in November 1985, to playing in front of a packed Reading Festival in 1986, but was followed by the departure of Kid Chaos who joined The Cult. Zodiac regrouped by assigning Trash D Garbage on Bass and Flash Bastard (Jan Cyrka) on rhythm guitar section. The expanded five member outfit all went on to record Zodiac Mindwarp and the Love Reaction's debut album in 1988 entitled Tattooed Beat Messiah. Other band members playing bass include Suzi X, Tex Diablo and Kev Reverb; whilst previous drummers were Robbie Vomm and The Apocalypse.

The act produced a UK Singles Chart Top 20 hit with the breakthrough record "Prime Mover".

Half of the bands 1989 follow on tour for the album was cancelled after he was run over outside the Leadmill, Sheffield. 

In recent years, Manning has established himself as an author, penning A Bible of Dreams (1994) and Bad Wisdom (1996, both Bill Drummond); plus Crucify Me Again (2000), Get Your Cock Out (2000), Fucked by Rock (2001), Collateral Damage, and The Wild Highway (2005, again with Drummond). Manning is also a regular contributor to The Idler magazine.

Notable collaborations

 Mindwarp co-wrote the track "There's a Barbarian in the Back of My Car" on the Voice of the Beehive album, Let It Bee.
 He also wrote the track "Feed My Frankenstein" which was covered on the Alice Cooper album, Hey Stoopid.  Due to Alice changing a small number of the lyrics for his version, he is listed as co-writer. Zodiac Mindwarp and The Love Reaction's own version of the song appeared on their album Hoodlum Thunder.
 In 1992, Mindwarp appeared on the album 456 by The Grid, performing lead vocals on the track "Fire Engine Red". Love Reaction guitarist Cobalt Stargazer also appeared on the album, performing on the tracks "Face the Sun" and "Leave Your Body".
 The Love Reaction once appeared as Belinda Carlisle's (mimed) backing band at a late 1980s/early 1990s award show for the song "Leave a Light On".

Discography

Singles and EPs

Albums
 ..High Priest of love  (1986)
 Tattooed Beat Messiah (1988) – UK No. 20 (re-released in 1997 as The Best of Zodiac Mindwarp and the Love Reaction)
 Hoodlum Thunder (1991)
 Live at Reading (1993)
 One More Knife (1994)
 I Am Rock (2002) – (re-released in 2005 with four demo bonus tracks)
 Weapons of Mass Destruction (live album) (2004)
 Rock Savage (2005)
 Pandora's Grisly Handbag (1986 live album and DVD) (2006)
 We Are Volsung (2010)

References

External links
 

1985 establishments in the United Kingdom
English hard rock musical groups
Musical groups established in 1985
Vertigo Records artists